Robert C. Birkby is an American adventure guide, author, photographer, speaker and trail designer.

Birkby grew up in Sidney, Iowa. As a Boy Scout, Birkby was on staff at summer camp, made a trek at Philmont Scout Ranch and earned Eagle Scout. In 2010, Birkby also received the Boy Scouts of America's highest award for conservation: the William T. Hornaday Gold Award. While attending college, he spent his summer breaks working at Philmont in positions such as a trail crew foreman and director of conservation.

After college, Birkby was an English instructor at Missouri State University. He thru-hiked the Appalachian Trail. Moving to Seattle, he became an author, writing magazine articles for Boys' Life and merit badge pamphlets on subjects such as backpacking. He worked for the Student Conservation Association, directing trail building across the US.

Birkby met Scott Fischer in 1982, and was convinced to climb Mount Olympus. He then worked for Fischer's adventure travel company Mountain Madness as a writer and guide, co-leading adventure trips to the Cascade Range, Alaska, Mount Kilimanjaro, Mount Elbrus and Nepal. After Fischer's death in the 1996 Everest disaster, Birkby wrote the biography Mountain Madness.

Birkby wrote the 10th, 11th and 12th editions of the Boy Scout Handbook and the 4th edition of the Fieldbook.

Starting in 2008, Birkby aided in the construction of the Great Baikal Trail, an environmental trail system along Lake Baikal in Siberia.

Works

References

Living people
American mountain climbers
People from Sidney, Iowa
American male non-fiction writers
20th-century American male writers
20th-century American non-fiction writers
21st-century American male writers
21st-century American non-fiction writers
Writers from Iowa
Year of birth missing (living people)